Diana Gómez Raich (born 7 March 1989) is a Spanish actress. She became popular for her role as Tatiana in the flashbacks of the crime drama series Money Heist. She is also known for her leading role in Valeria.

Biography 
Born on 7 March 1989 in Igualada, Catalonia. Fond of dance, tap dance and jazz music and with a background in theatre, her film debut took place in 2006, as background actress in Manuel Huerga's Salvador, whereas her debut in television took place a year later, playing Júlia in the historical drama series La Via Augusta, broadcast on TV3. She then played minor roles in other TV shows. She also starred in more prominent roles in the telenovela El secreto de Puente Viejo, broadcast on Antena 3, and in Joel Joan's , broadcast on TV3.

Filmography 

Television

Film

References 

Film actresses from Catalonia
Spanish film actresses
Spanish television actresses
Television actresses from Catalonia
21st-century Spanish actresses
1989 births
Living people